Serra Grande, Portuguese for "large mountain chain", may refer to:

 Serra Grande, Paraíba, a  municipality in the state of Paraíba, Brazil
 Serra Grande, Valença, a district in the municipality of Valença, Bahia, Brazil
 Serra Grande Gold Mine
 Serra da Ibiapaba, an upland in northeastern Brazil, also known as Serra Grande